Ahmad Joudeh (born 4 April 1990 in Yarmouk) is a Dutch ballet dancer and a choreographer. He was born and raised as a stateless refugee in Syria. He moved to the Netherlands with help of the Dutch National Ballet Company in 2016. He is currently internationally active as an artist. In 2021, he obtained the Dutch nationality.

Early life 
Born in 1990, Joudeh grew up in Yarmouk, a Palestinian refugee camp in Damascus, His mother is Syrian, his father Palestinian. Although his father did not approve of his interest in dance, Joudeh persisted, studying dance in Damascus.

From 2007 until 2016, he lived in Damascus, studying dance,  and teaching ballet to support himself, and to orphaned and disabled children free of charge. His mother still lives  in Syria. His father is  an asylum seeker center in Germany, where father and son recently reconciled after an estrangement of eleven years.

Dance 
In 2014 he was a contestant in the Arab version of So You Think You Can Dance. He made it to the semi-finals.his appearances  brought him to the attention of Dutch filmmaker Roozbeh Kaboly, who produced a documentary that aired on Dutch television.

Joudeh has also produced several short YouTube videos that depict him dancing in Syria.

Dutch documentaries 
In 2016 Roozbeh Kaboly, from the Dutch news program Nieuwsuur, made a 50-minute documentary about Ahmad called Dance or Die.  It depicts him dancing in the ruins of the camp where he had grown up, visiting his family's former home in Palmyra, which has been destroyed, with his mother, and the ancient Roman theater of Palmyra, where he dances. Joudeh also takes the filmmakers to his dance studio in Damascus, where some of his young students talk about their lives, and what dance means to them. The ancient Roman theater in Palmrya was subsequently destroyed by ISIL.

In 2018, a second film about Joudeh, Dance for Peace, which includes his meeting and reconciliation with his father at his refugee camp in Berlin, was broadcast on Dutch television on the Nieuwsuur program. It depicts his life once he has moved to the Netherlands and has begun dancing with the Dutch National Ballet Company.   Dance or Die has been awarded with an Emmy in the category  Arts Programming at the International Emmy Awards in New York.

Life in the Netherlands 
After the documentaries aired, Joudeh received invitations to dance  from a number of countries, including the U.S., Switzerland and Belgium. He decided to go to the Netherlands at the invitation of Ted Brandsen, artistic director of the Dutch National Ballet Company. Brandsen also started a crowd funder titled Dance for Peace to support Joudeh.

On 20 May 2021, Joudeh performed during the interval of the second semi-final of Eurovision Song Contest 2021 in Rotterdam alongside BMX-er Dez Maarsen.

References

External links 
 Official website http://www.ahmadjoudeh.com/
 Seeing Dance article, Dec. 2016 by David Mead
  Dance Magazine  December 2016  Lauren Wingenroth
 Niewsuur Documentary Episode 1, 2016 Joudeh  and his mother visit the ruins of his family home in Palmyra, dances in the ancient Theatre of PalmyraNiewsuur 
 Documentary Episode 2, 2016  Dance or Die, Roosbeh  Kaboly (In English)
 Nieuwsuur Documentary, Episode 3 January 11, 2017 Judeh meets his father first time in 11 years, interspersed with him dancing with Dutch National Ballet , in English and Arabic with subtitles 
 English translation of Joudeh audition for So You Think You Can Dance
 Ahmad Joudeh contemporary dance performance, So You Think You can Dance, December 2014
 Ahmad Joudeh Facebook page
 Ahmad Joudeh YouTube video 2015
 Ahmad Joudeh surprises the dance cast of Sound Of Silence
 Ahmad Joudeh YouTube video "Skin and Bones" 2016
 Fusion YouTube July 7 2017
 Danish ballet troupe performs dance created in honor of Joudeh

National Ballet, Dutch
Dutch National Ballet
Syrian dancers
1990 births
Living people
Dutch people of Syrian descent
Dutch people of Palestinian descent
Syrian emigrants to the Netherlands